Jaroslav Kostelecky (born April 26, 1979) is a Czech racing driver. He has competed in such series as the German Formula Three Championship. He won the 2002 season of Austria Formula 3 Cup.

References

External links
 

1979 births
Living people
Czech racing drivers
German Formula Three Championship drivers
Austrian Formula Three Championship drivers